Coda (stylised as CODA) is a Sydney-based art-rock band. They mix classical strings and contemporary music. Their album There Is A Way To Fly was nominated for the ARIA Award for Best World Music Album at the ARIA Music Awards of 2002. and Calling Mission Mu was nominated for the same award in 2007.

Members
 Nick Wales - keyboards, viola
 Naomi Radom - violin, accordion
 Jared Underwood - drums
 Bree Van Reyk - vibraphone, percussion

Former members
 Zoe Hauptman - bass
 Jeremy Barnett - vibraphone, percussion
 Oliver Smith - bass
 Veronique Serret - violin
 Mina Kanaridis - vocals
 Ed Goyer - drums
 Matthew Steffen - bass
 Kim Moyes - percussion

Discography

Studio albums

Extended Plays

Awards and nominations

ARIA Music Awards
The ARIA Music Awards is an annual awards ceremony that recognises excellence, innovation, and achievement across all genres of Australian music. 

! 
|-
| ARIA Music Awards of 2002
| There Is A Way To Fly
| ARIA Award for Best World Music Album
| 
| 
|-
| ARIA Music Awards of 2007
| Calling Mission Mu
| ARIA Award for Best World Music Album
| 
| 
|-

References

Australian classical music groups
Musical groups established in 1994
1994 establishments in Australia